The 2010–11 MKE Ankaragücü season was the 29th consecutive season for the club from Ankara in the Süper Lig.

Current squad

Süper Lig

League table

Results summary

Results by round

Matches

First half

Second half

Turkish Cup

Play-off round

Group stage

External links
MKE Ankaragücü Official Website 
Turkish Football Federation - MKE Ankaragücü 

2010-11
Turkish football clubs 2010–11 season